Pavel Aleksandrovich Mochalin (born 16 January 1989) is a Russian former football defender.

Club career
He played two seasons in the Russian Football National League for FC SKA-Energiya Khabarovsk.

External links
 
 
 

1989 births
Footballers from Saint Petersburg
Living people
Russian footballers
Russia youth international footballers
Russia under-21 international footballers
Association football defenders
FC Zenit Saint Petersburg players
PFC Spartak Nalchik players
FK Ventspils players
FC SKA-Khabarovsk players
Latvian Higher League players
Russian expatriate footballers
Expatriate footballers in Latvia